Kevin Formby (born 22 July 1971) is a former English  footballer who played as a defender.

References

1981 births
Living people
English footballers
Association football defenders
Rochdale A.F.C. players
Southport F.C. players
English Football League players